The Navajo Hogan is a historic building and restaurant located on 2817 N. Nevada Ave. in Colorado Springs, Colorado. It was added to the National Register of Historic Places on September 13, 1990.

The building is currently a restaurant.

References

External links

Buildings and structures in Colorado Springs, Colorado
National Register of Historic Places in Colorado Springs, Colorado